032c magazine is a bi-annual, English-language contemporary culture magazine that covers art, fashion, and politics. It was founded in 2001 by Joerg Koch and is published in Berlin.

History
The magazine was founded in Berlin in 2001 by Joerg Koch, a freelance journalist who had previously run a gallery, and Sandra von Mayer-Myrtenhain . It was originally created as a way to win attention for the domain 032c.com. The original cover featured a giant red square, a reference to the bold color in the Pantone Matching System for which the publication is named. Now the magazine has featured names such as Kanye West and Ricardo Tisci on its cover.

Reception
032c has received acclaim for its design and was awarded one of Germany's Lead Awards for National Visual Lead Magazine in 2006 . The magazine's new design layout in 2007 became a hotly debated issue in the fashion and media world. 032c was awarded the German media award Lead Magazine of the Year in 2008 . Its fashion editorials have been awarded Lead Mood and Fashion Photography awards in 2014 and 2015 .

References

External links
 Official website

2001 establishments in Germany
Biannual magazines published in Germany
English-language magazines
Fashion magazines
Visual arts magazines published in Germany
Magazines established in 2001
Magazines published in Berlin
Biannual magazines